The 2012 Ukrainian Figure Skating Championships took place on December 21–22, 2011 in Kyiv. Skaters competed in the disciplines of men's singles, ladies' singles, pair skating, and ice dancing on the senior level. The results may be used as part of Ukraine's selection process for the 2012 World Championships and 2012 European Championships.

The Junior Championships were held in February 2012.

Results

Men

Ladies

Pairs

Ice dancing

References

External links
 Results

2012
2012 in figure skating
2011 in figure skating
Figure Skating Championships,2012
Figure Skating Championships,2012
December 2011 sports events in Ukraine